The 1996 Harvard Crimson football team was an American football team that represented Harvard University during the 1996 NCAA Division I-AA football season. The Crimson tied for second-to-last in the Ivy League.

In their third year under head coach Timothy Murphy, the Crimson compiled a 4–6 record and were outscored 164 to 163. Sean Riley was the team captain.

Harvard's 2–5 conference record tied for sixth in the Ivy League standings. The Crimson were outscored 115 to 98 by Ivy opponents.

Harvard played its home games at Harvard Stadium in the Allston neighborhood of Boston, Massachusetts.

Schedule

Roster

References

Harvard
Harvard Crimson football seasons
Harvard Crimson football
Harvard Crimson football